Cercato is a family name of Italian origin. It may refer to:

 Aba Cercato (born 1939), Italian television presenter and announcer
 Simone Cercato (born 1975), Italian  freestyle swimmer

Italian-language surnames
Surnames of Italian origin